Park Jung-bum (born 1976) is a South Korean film director, screenwriter and actor. Park wrote, directed, and acted in his directorial debut The Journals of Musan (2011), which won the New Currents Award and FIPRESCI Award at the 15th Busan International Film Festival, Golden Star at the 10th Marrakech International Film Festival, Tiger Award at the 39th International Film Festival Rotterdam, Grand Prize and Young Critics Award at the 47th Pesaro International Film Festival, Jury Prize at the 13th Deauville Asian Film Festival, and more - a total of 17 awards were won at major film festivals around the world since it premiered at the Busan International Film Festival in 2010.

Filmography 
Templementary (short film, 2001) - director, producer, actor  
125 Jeon Seung-chul (short film, 2008) - director, screenwriter, producer, planner, actor
Poetry (2010) - assistant director
The Journals of Musan (2011) - director, screenwriter, executive producer, actor 
Jury (short film, 2012) - actor
If You Were Me 6 (segment: "Dear Du-han") (2013) - director, screenwriter 
Alive (2015) - director, screenwriter, producer, planner, actor 
Now Playing (2015) - actor
A Quiet Dream (2016) - actor
Height of the Wave (2019) - director, actor
All the Things We Never Said (2020) - actor

Awards 
2008 34th Seoul Independent Film Festival: Award for Excellence (125 Jeon Seung-chul)
2011 10th Tribeca Film Festival: Best New Narrative Filmmaker (The Journals of Musan)
2011 20th Buil Film Awards: Best New Director (The Journals of Musan) 
2011 31st Korean Association of Film Critics Awards: Best New Director (The Journals of Musan)
2014 29th Mar del Plata International Film Festival: Silver Astor for Best Actor (Alive)
2015 9th Asia Pacific Screen Awards: Jury Grand Prize (Alive)

References

External links 
 
 
 

1976 births
Living people
South Korean film directors
South Korean screenwriters
South Korean male film actors